Marius Hardiman is a former British weightlifter who competed in the 82.5 kg, 83 kg, 85 kg and 77 kg categories. He now coaches weightlifting at Oxford Powersports.

References
http://www.oxfordpowersports.co.uk/member-profiles/marius-hardiman-head-coach/
http://www.oxfordmail.co.uk/news/yourtown/oxford/10250549.Weights_made_me_who_I_am__says_former_champion/
http://www.iwrp.net/best-weightlifters?view=contestant&id_zawodnik=16478

Living people
Welsh male weightlifters
British male weightlifters
Commonwealth Games competitors for Wales
Weightlifters at the 1998 Commonwealth Games
Year of birth missing (living people)